Korumdu is a village in the Issyk-Kul Region of Kyrgyzstan, on Issyk Kul Lake. It is part of the Issyk-Kul District. Its population was 3,458 in 2021.

References

Populated places in Issyk-Kul Region